Bainbridge High School  is a public high school located in Bainbridge, Georgia, United States. The school is part of the Decatur County School District, which serves Decatur County.

History 
When education first started in the town, there were two buildings, a grammar school and high school.  The grammar school building was constructed in 1913 by Wm. A. Edwards of Atlanta.  The high school building was erected in 1922 by G. Lloyd Preacher of Atlanta.

The school's curriculum includes the following departments: mathematics, science, languages, history, English, home economics, commercial, and diversified occupations. Extracurricular activities include athletics, band, glee club, piano, spoken English, 4-H Club, Beta Club, Tri-Hi-Y, and Hi Y.

Bainbridge High School opened around September 1966 as an all-white school, and became integrated around 1970.

On April 25, 1964 the senior class sponsored, for the first time, the Miss Bainbridge High School contest.  Each class chose one girl to represent it in the contest. Eligibility required that the girl possess good grades, personality, talent, and beauty.  Seventeen young ladies participated in the pageant.  One of the most capable and personable belles of BHS,  Mary Ann Ward, was the first to be crowned Miss Bainbridge High School of 1964.  A sophomore  Joyce Wells received the second place title, and placing third in the pageant was  Bunny Mills.

Bainbridge High School’s first foreign exchange student was  Ana Ary, from Fortaleza, Brazil. She graduated with the class of 1977 and later returned to Brazil to continue her studies.

In 1994, soccer was introduced to Bainbridge High School, coached by Richard Colon.

In August 2009, students from Decatur County went to a new high school located on Highway 84. The old high school is now home for Bainbridge Middle School (grades 7-8), while Hutto Middle School holds grades 5-6 while Potter Street, Elcan King, Jones Wheat, John Johnson, and West Bainbridge Elementary hold PK-4. In 2021 to the current year, the grade system of Decatur County School District also made a revamp. Now, Hutto Middle School is now an elementary school, holding grades 3-5, and Bainbridge Middle School is now in align with other Georgia middle schools as it now holds 6-8. In 2021, Elcan King Elementary had been closed. John Johnson Elementary School is now Bainbridge Public Safety Training Center, Potter Street Elementary School is now New Beginnings Learning Center and Elcan King Elementary School has been demolished for a parking lot. The only running elementary and primary schools in the county currently are Jones Wheat Primary School, West Bainbridge Primary School and Hutto Elementary School. West Bainbridge Primary School was a elementary school, holding grades PK-4 until the change which turned them into a primary school, now currently only holding the grades of Pre-k to 2nd grade. There is also one new charter high school, even though in the past Bainbridge High School and Grace Christian Academy were the only high schools. 
Due to the change in 2008-2009, Hutto Middle School 6th grade students did not have any access to varsity school sports, with the only programs close to it being club sports which had games but were done in the presence of teachers during school hours, and there not being any away games. Now with the change in 2021, that is resolved. New 6th grade students at Bainbridge Middle School now have access to varsity sports, such as Football, Basketball, Baseball, Softball, Soccer, Tennis, Golf, Cross Country, & Track & Field.

Notable alumni
 James Butler - player for NFL's St. Louis Rams
 Cathy Cox - former Georgia Secretary of State, former president of Young Harris College, and current Dean of Mercer University Law School
 Jason Lancaster - vocalist for Go Radio
 Brian Powell - former professional baseball player (Detroit Tigers, Houston Astros, San Francisco Giants, Philadelphia Phillies)
 Paul Kwilecki - Paul Kwilecki was an American documentary photographer.
 Ken Rice - former Buffalo Bills NFL player in the 1950s
 Ernest Riles - former Major League Baseball player in the 1980s
 Kirby Smart - head football coach of the University of Georgia Bulldogs
Dameon Pierce - Starting Running Back of the Houston Texans

State Titles
Football (2) - 1982(3A), 2018(5A) 
Boys' Golf (1) - 1968(2A) 
Boys' Track (1) - 2010(4A)

Other GHSA State Titles
Literary (1) - 1951(A)

References

Public high schools in Georgia (U.S. state)
Schools in Decatur County, Georgia
G. Lloyd Preacher buildings